Baiyü County ( or Pelyül) is a county in far western Sichuan, China on the border with the Tibet Autonomous Region. It is under the administration of the Garzê Tibetan Autonomous Prefecture.

Administrative divisions 
 Seat: Jianshe Town (建设镇) (Pelyul) 
 Jinsha Township (金沙乡)
 Ronggai Township (绒盖乡)
 Zhangdu Township (章都乡)
 Marong Township (麻绒乡)
 Hepo Township (河坡乡)
 Rejia Township (热加乡)
 Denglong Township (登龙乡)
 Zengke Township (赠科乡)
 Acha Township (阿察乡)
 Maqiong Township (麻邛乡)
 Liaoxi Township (辽西乡)
 Nata Township (纳塔乡)
 Anzi Township (安孜乡)
 Gaiyu Township (盖玉乡)
 Shama Township (沙马乡)
 Shanyan Township (山岩乡)

Climate

Monasteries 
The Palyul Monastery is located in Baiyü County as is the Yarchen Monastery and Katok Monastery. Nyoshul Jonpalung Monastery, founded by Khenpo Ngaga (1879-1941) in 1910, is located in the county's Dzin Valley of Tromtar. It is a Nyingma monastery which is considered a branch of Katok. 

Adzom Gön Monastery (Anzom, Anzom Chogar, 'od gsal theg mchog gling, Osel Tekchok Ling, Osal Tegchogling) is another branch of Katok in the Tromtar (romkok (khrom tar / khrom khog) region. 

The founder, Adzom Drukpa Drondul Pawo Dorje (a 'dzom 'brug pa 'gro 'dul dpa' bo rdo rje) was born in 1842 in Tashi Dungkargang in the Tromtar region. 

Tromge Monastery (Tromge Gon khrom dge dgon) was founded in 1275 in the Tromtar Valley. It is a branch of Katok Monastery. 

Jazi Amnye Drodul Pema Garwang Lingpa (1901-1975) entered Tromge Monastery at age 11. 

Tromge Monastery School was established in the 2000s to provide a traditional education to about two dozen students.

References 

 
Populated places in the Garzê Tibetan Autonomous Prefecture
County-level divisions of Sichuan